Mundoo is the name of several geographic localities:

Mundoo, Queensland, a town in Australia
Mundoo (Laamu Atoll), an island in the Maldives
Mundoo Island, an island in Lake Alexandrina in South Australia
Mundoo Island, South Australia, a locality in the Alexandrina Council